was the 10th daimyō of Obama Domain in mid- to late Edo period Japan.

Biography
Tadayuki was the seventh son of Sakai Tadaka of Tsuruga Domain and was posthumously adopted as heir to Obama on the death of Sakai Tadatsura in 1806. His wife was a daughter of Okudaira Masashika of Nakatsu Domain. In 1808, he becamejisha-bugyō and from 1808 to 1815 served as the 37th Kyoto Shoshidai In 1815, he was ordered to oversee the reconstruction of the 5-story pagoda at Nikkō Tōshō-gū, which had been destroyed by a fire. Later that year, he was promoted to rōjū, holding that post until his death in 1828.

References

Further reading
 Appert, Georges and H. Kinoshita. (1888).  Ancien Japon. Tokyo: Imprimerie Kokubunsha.
 Meyer, Eva-Maria. (1999).  Japans Kaiserhof in de Edo-Zeit: Unter besonderer Berücksichtigung der Jahre 1846 bis 1867. Münster: Tagenbuch. 
 Papinot, Jacques Edmund Joseph. (1906) Dictionnaire d'histoire et de géographie du japon. Tokyo: Librarie Sansaisha...Click link for digitized 1906 Nobiliaire du japon (2003)

External links
 Nikko pagoda – Sakai Tadakatsu contributed to the original construction; and after it was burned in 1815, his descendants supported reconstruction in 1818
 Toshogu pagoda in Nikko – interior view--exterior view, Nagasaki University Library Collection

|-

Fudai daimyo
Sakai clan
Kyoto Shoshidai
Rōjū
1770 births
1828 deaths